Geoffrey Hubert Ward (22 November 1926 – 20 April 2008) was an English cricketer.  Ward was a right-handed batsman who fielded as a wicket-keeper.  He was born at Sittingbourne, Kent.

Ward made two first-class appearances for Kent against Lancashire and Sussex in the 1949 County Championship, scoring 19 runs at an average of 9.50, with a high score of 6 not out, while behind the stumps he took 2 catches and made a single stumping.  These were his only first-class appearances for Kent, in 1950 he moved to Essex, where he represented the county in a single first-class match against the Combined Services.  In this match, he scored 2 runs in Essex's first-innings before being dismissed by John Deighton, while in their second-innings he made the same score before being dismissed by Brian Close.

He died at Bearsted, Kent on 20 April 2008.

References

External links

1926 births
2008 deaths
People from Sittingbourne
English cricketers
Kent cricketers
Essex cricketers
Wicket-keepers